Umar Ali Khan is an Indian Politician and a member of Uttar Pradesh Legislative Assembly from Behat representing Samajwadi Party since March 2022. He is son in law of Syed Ahmed Bukhari. He has earlier served as a member of Uttar Pradesh Legislative Council.

References 

Uttar Pradesh MLAs 2022–2027
Samajwadi Party politicians from Uttar Pradesh
Year of birth missing (living people)
Members of the Uttar Pradesh Legislative Council
Living people

External link
website